Cradlesong is the second solo studio album by the Matchbox Twenty lead-singer Rob Thomas, released on June 30, 2009 by Atlantic Records. The album's first single "Her Diamonds" was a success around the world, while reaching number three in Australia and topping the Billboard Hot Adult Top 40 Tracks chart, meanwhile other singles "Someday" and "Mockingbird" attained success on the Adult Contemporary charts.

The album received mostly positive reviews, with the single "Her Diamonds", a song written about his wife and her illness, receiving praise by many reviewers. The album takes a pop rock feel with a variety of sounds mixed by longtime producer Matt Serletic who is praised for smooth production of the album. It debuted on the US Billboard 200 at number #3 selling 122,000 copies, while reaching top-ten positions in Canada and Australia.

Background
On September 15, 2008, Thomas told Billboard.com that he's "probably about 80 percent done" with his second solo record, tentatively titled Cradle Songs at the time. Thomas characterized the album as "the usual mish-mosh of styles, but hopefully just holding true to a bunch of good songs." with the article also mentioning that the record will nonetheless feature several tracks that "take a more global, rhythmic direction after working with South American and African percussionists." Thomas explained one such experiment:

On February 25, 2009, it was announced via Fox News that the album's then-supposed title was Cradle Song. It was mentioned, in addition, that there "are at least four hot singles awaiting radio play including 'Her Diamonds' and 'Someday.'" On the same day, Thomas announced on his official website that he has been "back and forth to Los Angeles quite a bit, mixing the new record." However, he denied the album will be released in May, mentioning it "looks like it won't be coming until the last week of June or the first week of July."

On March 2, 2009, Clark Collis of Entertainment Weekly interviewed Thomas, where he confirmed he has since shelved his initial efforts to evoke The Rhythm of the Saints, and claimed the album is scheduled for a June 30 release. Having played half the forthcoming album to Entertainment Weekly, it was reported that many of the lyrics on Cradle Song center around troubled relationships, and three more song titles were revealed: "Meltdown" (described as "INXS-esque power pop" that stood out as "a possible first single"), "Fire on the Mountain" (an "epic, tribal drum-driven" track inspired by Dave Eggers' book "What Is the What: The Autobiography of Valentino Achak Deng") and the melancholic country-leaning "Getting Late" (suggested as the "set's likely closer" and what Thomas described as "a little ditty about death." in the vein of Tom Petty and Willie Nelson.) The proper magazine article added that "Someday" is a power ballad with a tinkling piano introduction reminiscent of 1980s band Damn Yankees.

On March 4, 2009, Thomas clarified on the message board of his official web-site that the album's title will be one word: "cradlesong". He announced that the lead single for this album had been chosen and a director is being sought after for the video. Thomas also announced that, at the time, he had mixed eleven songs so far and had recorded a total of twenty-seven. He confirmed a total of twelve songs will make the final cut, but added "the first pressing will have an extra 3 on it as well" and "later in the year i'm going to try to find a way to release the others, but i'll keep popping them out here and there at shows."

On March 6, 2009, minute-long snippets of the tracks "Meltdown" and "Her Diamonds" were temporarily featured on the front page of his official site. Despite being removed from the website, they are presently being featured in a RateTheMusic survey.

On April 27, 2009 the first single "Her Diamonds" was released on iTunes. The song is about his wife Marisol and her longtime illness. This was followed by "Give Me the Meltdown" on June 9, "Someday" on June 16, and "Fire on the Mountain" on June 23. All four singles were released before the album's release date on June 30, 2009. "Someday" featured in promo spots for NBC's 2009 fall season of The Biggest Loser.

Rob kicked off his Cradlesong Tour in Hollywood, Florida starting on September 23, 2009 at the Hard Rock Live.

Critical reception

At Metacritic, which assigns a normalized rating out of 100 to reviews from mainstream critics, the album received an average score of 73, based on 7 reviews, which indicates "generally positive reviews". 

Billboard review said that "Thomas returns with a soaring collection of infectious pop songs that are destined for heavy rotation in 2009 and beyond". Allmusic also gave a positive review: "This dogged sense of purpose does result in a tighter, better record than Something to Be and even it's not a lot of fun, it's not meant to be: it's big music about big issues, even inflating personal issues to the universal". 

Rolling Stone stated that "There is plenty of unexpected texture to keep your ears engaged". Los Angeles Times stated that "Thomas presides over a sleekly produced, constantly undulating mixture of sounds that seems designed to appeal to all of the people all of the time". 

The New York Times review considered Cradlesong his second persistently polite, numbingly polished solo album". The Boston Globe stated, "The Matchbox Twenty frontman's second solo album showcases all of his admirable middle-of-the-road gifts and offers a glimpse of the possibilities when he explores the more extreme edges".

Chart performance
Cradlesong made a positive debut on the Billboard 200 at number #3, selling 122,000 copies while "Her Diamonds" ascended up the Billboard Hot 100 to a peak of 23. As of July 12, 2015, Cradlesong has sold 493,000
copies in the United States.

Track listing

Bonus DVD
A deluxe edition is available exclusively from Target stores in the US. Included is the original standard studio album, as well as a bonus DVD which includes interviews, plus a behind-the-scenes look at the album photo shoot and video shoot for "Her Diamonds". It can be purchased in said stores or online via Target's website.

Personnel

 Chris Lord-Alge – mixing
 Rusty Anderson – acoustic guitar, electric guitar
 Alex Arias – assistant engineer, Pro Tools
 Keith Armstrong – assistant engineer
 Kenny Aronoff – drums
 Stevie Blacke – strings
 Michael Bland – drums, snaps
 Marcus Brown – African drums
 Sherree Ford Brown – background vocals
 Tom Bukovac – acoustic guitar, bass guitar, beat box, snaps
 Lenny Castro – percussion
 Jason Dale – assistant engineer
 Jack Daley – bass guitar
 Mark Dobson – percussion, engineer, Pro Tools
 Keith Fiddmont – saxophone
 Sharlotte Gibson – background vocals
 Soro Gnenemon – African drums
 James Grundler – background vocals
 Sean Hurley – bass guitar
 Kim Hutchcroft – saxophone
 Victor Indrizzo – percussion, drums
 Nik Karpen – assistant engineer
 Jim Keltner – drums
 Reverend Shuichi Tom Kurai – Taiko drums
 Abe Laboriel Jr. – drums
 Michael Landau – electric guitar
 Mike Leisz – engineer, assistant engineer, Pro Tools
 Ria Lewerke – art direction, design, arrangement, snaps, art conception
 Michael Lippman – management
 Bob Ludwig – mastering
 Andrew McPherson – photography
 Norman Moore – art direction, design
 Taylor Moyer – Taiko drums
 Justin Niebank – engineer
 Alfred Ortiz – Taiko drums
 Ben Peeler – Bouzouki, steel guitar, oud, Lap steel guitar
 Tim Pierce – acoustic guitar, electric guitar, snaps
 Louise Robinson – illustrations
 Andrew Schubert – Pro Tools
 Dean Serletic – production coordination
 Matt Serletic – piano, arranger, keyboards, hammond organ, programming, background vocals, producer, vocal arrangement, horn arrangements, snaps
 Lee Sklar – bass guitar
 Jimmie Lee Sloas – bass guitar
 Robert Smith – African drums
 Dino Soldo – saxophone
 Magatte Sow – African drums
 Dejan Stanjevic – engineer, assistant engineer
 Jordan Stilwell – assistant engineer
 Jess Sutcliffe – engineer
 Shari Sutcliffe – contractor
 Bryan Sutton – acoustic guitar, mandolin
 Marisol Thomas – background vocals, co-arranger
 Rob Thomas – lead vocals, acoustic guitar, keyboards, Tom-Tom, background vocals
 Lee Thornburg – trumpet
 Adam Tilzer – assistant engineer
 Robyn Troup – background vocals
 Jose Vergara – African drums
 Butch Walker – background vocals
 Patrick Warren – piano, keyboards, hammond organ, chamberlin, pump organ, string arrangements, snaps
 Hal Winer – engineer, assistant engineer
 Patrick Woodward – assistant engineer, Pro Tools

Charts and certifications

Weekly charts

Year-end charts

Certifications

References

External links
 RobThomasMusic.com — Rob Thomas's official website

2009 albums
Rob Thomas (musician) albums
Atlantic Records albums
Albums produced by Matt Serletic